George Rhodes (14 July 1816 – 18 June 1864) was a New Zealand pastoralist. He was born in Epworth, Lincolnshire, England in 1816. William Barnard Rhodes, his eldest brother, was the first from his family to settle in New Zealand in 1840. George Rhodes' third son Arthur Rhodes went on to be a member of parliament and mayor of Christchurch.

References

1816 births
1864 deaths
New Zealand farmers
People from Epworth, Lincolnshire
English emigrants to New Zealand
Moorhouse–Rhodes family